One Fine Day may refer to:

Music 
 "One Fine Day" (song), a song written by Gerry Goffin and Carole King which was a 1963 hit for the Chiffons
 "One Fine Day" (Jung Yong-hwa song), 2015
 "One Fine Day", a song by Marillion from This Strange Engine
 "One Fine Day", a song by the Offspring from Conspiracy of One
 "One Fine Day", a song by Jakatta
 "One Fine Day", a song by David Byrne and Brian Eno from Everything That Happens Will Happen Today
 "One Fine Day", a song by Hayley Westenra from Treasure
 "One Fine Day" (Tom Robinson song), a 1980 song by the band Sector 27 on the album Sector 27
 "One Fine Day", a song by Sting from 57th & 9th
 ”One Fine Day”, a song by Robbie Williams, b-side to Come Undone (Robbie Williams song) 
 One Fine Day (Katherine Jenkins album), 2011
 One Fine Day (Jung Yong-hwa album), 2015
 One Fine Day, an album by Tomomi Kahara
 One Fine Day, an EP by K.Will
 One Fine Day (band), a rock band from Hamburg, Germany
 One Fine Day (Chris Rea album), 2019

Other media 
 One Fine Day (film), a 1996 film starring Michelle Pfeiffer and George Clooney
 One Fine Day, a  1979 UK television film directed by Stephen Frears
 One Fine Day (book), a children's book by Nonny Hogrogian
 One Fine Day (South Korean TV series), a 2006 South Korean drama television series
 One Fine Day (U.S. TV series), a 2007–2008 American Internet Protocol television series produced in conjunction with students from a variety of Big Ten Universities

See also 
 "Un bel dì vedremo" ("One fine day we will see"), an aria from Puccini's opera Madama Butterfly